The 1991 European Judo Championships were held in Prague, Czechoslovakia from 16 to 19 May 1991.

Medal overview

Men

Women

Medal table

Results overview

Men

60 kg

65 kg

71 kg

78 kg

86 kg

95 kg

+95 kg

Open class

Women

48 kg

52 kg

56 kg

61 kg

66 kg

72 kg

+72 kg

Open class

References 
 Results of the 1991 European Judo Championships (JudoInside.com)
 

E
European Judo Championships
1991 in Czechoslovak sport
International sports competitions hosted by Czechoslovakia
Sports competitions in Prague
1990s in Prague
Judo competitions in Czechoslovakia
European Judo Championships